The Exploding Detective is a comedic novel written by John Swartzwelder, a writer most famous for his work on The Simpsons television series. The main character is a klutzy private detective named Frank Burly. This is Swartzwelder's fourth novel (and third to feature Frank Burly) and was published on March 12, 2007. The genre of the book is a cross between science fiction and comedy.

The Exploding Detective is the third book in Swartzwelder's Frank Burly series. The preceding book in the series is How I Conquered Your Planet, and the succeeding book is Dead Men Scare Me Stupid.

Plot 
To help differentiate himself from the rest of the private detectives in Central City, Frank Burly decides he needs a gimmick to attract customers.  He purchases a refurbished World War II jet pack that was part of a Nazi plot to conquer Heaven in the afterlife and outfits it with booster rockets that he bought from a women's fashion magazine.  Calling himself "The Flying Detective," he begins recklessly streaking across the skies of Central City and crashing into buildings.  In fact, the citizens of Central City see him crash, burn and explode so often that they begin to suspect the hapless detective possesses super powers that protect him from serious injury.

At the same time, a bizarre new crime wave hits the city.  An army of robots led by Napoleon commit a series of robberies in the industrial district, stealing chemicals and other raw materials.  Frustrated, the mayor and the chief of police approach Frank Burly about becoming the city's patron super hero.  In exchange for $1,500 a week, Burly agrees to don a cape and tights and fly through the city in the name of justice and goodness.  However, he soon finds he has bitten off more than he can chew when Napoleon turns out to be a robot and the real mastermind behind the crime wave unleashes his assassin robots against the Flying Detective.

Reception 
Overall, The Exploding Detective was mostly well received on book websites. Reviews on LibraryThing gave the book three-and-a-half stars. Reviews on Amazon were better, with the majority of the raters giving the book five stars. One reviewed liked the book "not because the plot's exceptional, or because the characters or scenarios are interesting [...] but because it's hands-down his funniest book." The book was also well received on Goodreads, which reviews noting the comical plot, interesting characters, and all-around funniness. ThriftBooks reviews for the book were also good; according to one review, Swartzwelder "refined and improved" what was better about his previous novels and left out what wasn't as good from them as well.

Sequels 

The Exploding Detective is third in the Frank Burly series, which currently consists of ten installments. Though the books do not tie into each other and can serve as standalone novels, each features Frank Burly, a detective who shares a likeness with Homer Simpson "if he hand't lucked out with Marge [Simpson]."

The next books in the series include The Fifty Foot Detective, Detective Made Easy, and Burly Go Home. Also, two short stories, The Monster That Wouldn't Sink and Earth's Biggest Fan, have been released, both in 2015, with the suffix "A Frank Burly Short Story" attached to the end. In November 2020, Swartzwelder announced that a new Frank Burly book, entitled The Spy With No Pants would "probably" be released in December of that year.

References

External links 

 JohnSwartzwelder.com

2007 American novels
American comedy novels
Comic science fiction novels
Superhero novels
American detective novels